The South-West Brabant Museum (Dutch: Zuidwestbrabants Museum) is a local museum in Halle, Flemish Brabant, Belgium. From 1981, the museum was housed in a former college of Jesuits from the 17th century. After a closure of half a year in 2014, it was reopened in Den Ast.

Collections 
It maintains and conserves around 20,000 pieces and is centered around archeology, music and the local histories of Halle, the Pajottenland, Zenne and Sonian.

The way of living of humans from earlier times is told. The museum rebuilt a workers home from the 19th century. A detailed look is given at weaving, pottery, braiding baskets, city guards, forging noble metals, painting art, glass art, agriculture and pilgrimage.

Another section pays attention to local musicians, like the cellist Adrien-François Servais (1807-1866) and various family members including his musical sons Franz and Joseph, granddaughter Misia Sert and sons-in-law Ernest Van Dyck and Cyprien Godebski.

In Den Ast, it is located at the former establishment of the Van Roye malt house. The ground floor covers eight hundred years of history of the city, including the pilgrimage. The first floor is focused on the musical culture in the city and carnival. There is also an experience trail through the old malt house. The exhibited collection is smaller than in the former Jesuit college, though it will be changed every four to five years. There are also digital presentations.

See also 
 List of museums in Belgium
 List of music museums

References 

Music museums in Belgium
Museums in Flemish Brabant
Local museums
Museums established in 1981
1981 establishments in Belgium